The Canton of Perpignan-2 is a French canton of Pyrénées-Orientales department, in Occitanie.

Composition

At the French canton reorganisation which came into effect in March 2015, the canton was expanded from 1 to 4 communes:
Bompas  
Perpignan (eastern part)
Sainte-Marie-la-Mer
Villelongue-de-la-Salanque

Before 2015, the Perpignan 2nd Canton included only the following neighbourhoods of Perpignan:
 East downtown
 Saint-Jacques
 Saint-Jean
 La Bassa
 Les Remparts

References 

Perpignan 2